Aashirman DS Joshi is a Nepalese film actor. He made his feature film debut with Gangster Blues (2017). He was praised as a debutant and won the National Award and Lux Kamana Film Award for 'Best Debut Actor' for his performance. His second feature film was The Break Up (2019).

He is one of the most good looking guys from Nepal and Joshi was on the list of 'Top 10 Men and Women of the Year in Nepal' published by Saptahik in 2019.

References

External links
 Aashirman DS Joshi on IMDb

Living people
Nepalese male film actors
21st-century Nepalese male actors
Year of birth missing (living people)